Kanya may refer to:
Kanya, an Indian astrological sign
Kánya, a town in Hungary
Kálmán Kánya (died 1945), a Hungarian foreign minister
Kanye, Botswana, a town